František Leikert (born 6 May 1914, date of death unknown) was a diver who competed for Czechoslovakia. He competed at the 1936 Summer Olympics in Berlin, where he placed 16th in 10 metre platform and 9th in springboard.

References

External links

1914 births
Year of death missing
Czech male divers
Olympic divers of Czechoslovakia
Divers at the 1936 Summer Olympics